Austrogomphus doddi, also known as Austrogomphus (Austrogomphus) doddi, is a species of dragonfly of the family Gomphidae, 
commonly known as the northern river hunter. 
It inhabits streams and rivers in north-eastern Queensland, Australia.

Austrogomphus doddi is a tiny to medium-sized, black and yellow dragonfly.

Gallery

See also
 List of Odonata species of Australia

References

Gomphidae
Odonata of Australia
Insects of Australia
Endemic fauna of Australia
Taxa named by Robert John Tillyard
Insects described in 1909